Veronika Remišová (born 31 May 1976) is a Slovak politician serving as the current Deputy Prime Minister of the Slovak Republic and the Minister of Investments, Regional Development and Informatization of the Slovak Republic. In 2016, she stood for the National Council as a member of Ordinary People. In 2019, she left the party and joined Andrej Kiska's For the People. In 2020 she was elected by delegates as the party's chair.

Notes

References 

1976 births
Living people
People from Žilina
For the People (Slovakia) politicians
21st-century Slovak women politicians
21st-century Slovak politicians
Members of the National Council (Slovakia) 2016-2020
Female members of the National Council (Slovakia)